William J. Foley (March 2, 1887 – December 1, 1952) was an American attorney and politician who served as District Attorney of Suffolk County, Massachusetts from 1927 until his death 1952.

Early life
Foley was born on March 2, 1887. He attended South Boston High School and The English High School. He graduated from the Boston University School of Law in 1908 and began practicing law that year.

Political career
From 1915 to 1919, Foley was a member of the Massachusetts House of Representatives. He then served in the Massachusetts Senate from 1919 to 1921 and on the Massachusetts Governor's Council from 1921 to 1923. In 1927 he defeated incumbent Thomas C. O'Brien to become District Attorney of Suffolk County. In 1933, Foley ran for Mayor of Boston. He finished a close third behind Frederick W. Mansfield and Malcolm Nichols. He ran again in 1937 and finished fourth behind Maurice J. Tobin, James Michael Curley, and Nichols.

Foley was found dead in his home on December 1, 1952. The cause of death was a heart attack. He was survived by his wife and two children, one of whom, William J. Foley Jr., was an assistant district attorney and a Boston City Councilor. Foley's first assistant, Garrett H. Byrne, was chosen by Governor Paul A. Dever, to succeed him despite pressure to give the job to the younger Foley or another well known political figure.

See also
 1915 Massachusetts legislature
 1916 Massachusetts legislature
 1917 Massachusetts legislature
 1918 Massachusetts legislature
 1919 Massachusetts legislature
 1920 Massachusetts legislature

References

1887 births
1952 deaths
20th-century American politicians
Boston University School of Law alumni
District attorneys in Suffolk County, Massachusetts
Democratic Party Massachusetts state senators
Members of the Massachusetts Governor's Council
Politicians from Boston
South Boston High School alumni
English High School of Boston alumni
Democratic Party members of the Massachusetts House of Representatives